Jimilai Nakaidawa (born 5 August 1985 in Fiji) is a Fijian rugby union footballer. He plays at flanker.

Career
Nakaidawa's first test for his country was against  at Bucharest on 28 November 2009. He has further been selected to play for the Fijian Warriors in 2010.

See also
Fiji Rugby Team
Fiji Rugby Union Players

External links
 Profile of Jimilai Nakaidawa
 Profile of Jimilai Nakaidawa

Fijian rugby union players
Fiji international rugby union players
Living people
1985 births
People from Naitasiri Province
I-Taukei Fijian people
Rugby union flankers